Jack Rudolph may refer to:

 Jack Rudolph (character), a fictional character on the U.S. television series Studio 60 on the Sunset Strip
 Jack Rudolph (American football) (1938–2019), American football player